Una district is a district in the Indian state of Himachal Pradesh. Una shares its border with the Hoshiarpur and Rupnagar districts of  Punjab and Kangra, Hamirpur, and Bilaspur districts of Himachal Pradesh. The terrain is generally plain with semi hills.

Una has five tehsils, namely Ghanari, Haroli, Amb, Bangana and Una itself. It was a tehsil of Hoshiarpur district until the Punjab Reorganisation Act, 1966 and Kangra district until 1972, after which it became a district of Himachal Pradesh.

Geography 

Una lies in the western part of Himachal Pradesh, with the Sivalik Hills of the Himalayas rolling on the western side and Solah Singhi range on the eastern side. The Satluj river alongside Shahtalai, known for the shrine of Baba Balak Nath passes through south of district near Nangal Dam and Beas passes at the north of district near Pong Dam, Talwara.

The altitude varies from more than 409 meters in plains to over 1000 meters in hills. Swan River which is basically seasonal river and also known as soul of district Una flows 65 km right across the Jaswan Valley towards south until it submerges in the Sutlej river near Anandpur.

Demographics

According to the 2011 census, Una district has a population of 521,173, giving it a ranking of 543rd in India (out of a total of 640). Its population growth rate over the decade 2001-2011 was 16.24%. Una has a sex ratio of 977 females for every 1000 males, and a literacy rate of 87.23%. 8.62% of the population lives in urban areas. Scheduled Castes and Scheduled Tribes make up 22.16% and 1.65% of the population respectively.

Language 

Local languages are Hindi, Punjabi and Pahari. Punjabi is mostly used in plain areas of Tehsil Ghanari, Haroli Tehsil, Tehsil Una, and parts of Tehsil Amb. In other areas like Tehsil Bangana and Chintpurni (Part of Amb Tehsil) Pahari dialect is spoken.

Politics 

 

|}

Education

Schools
 Rudra International School, Basal
 DAV Sr Sec Public School, Ambota
 Himalayan COnvent, Bhanjal
 Jawahar Navodaya Vidyalaya, Una
 Mount Carmel School, Una
 Mount Everest Model High School, Mehatpur
 PAR Model High School, Dohgi
 Sai Public School
 Saraswati School, Rampur
 Sunrise Public Sr Sec School, Saloh
 Vashist Public School
DAV

Places near Una 
 Dharamshala
 McLeod Ganj 
 Kangra
 Hoshiarpur
 Khajjiar
 Jawalamukhi 
 Chandigarh

Notes

External links 
 Official Link
 Una Profile
 Una District Cultural and Religious Heritage

References